Niyar (also Romanized as Nīyār) is a village in Shaskuh Rural District, Central District, Zirkuh County, South Khorasan Province, Iran. At the 2006 census, its population was 96, in 25 families.

References 

Populated places in Zirkuh County